Sun Jin (Chinese: 孙晋; born March 13, 1980) is a Chinese table tennis player. She won a silver medal at 2000 Sydney Olympic Games in women's doubles, with Yang Ying.

Further reading 
 "Sun Jin Enters Top Eight at Table Tennis Qualifying Tournament", People's Daily, Wednesday, March 1, 2000.

References 

 ITTF World Ranking for Sun Jin
 ITTF Stats for Sun Jin

1980 births
Living people
Chinese female table tennis players
Olympic table tennis players of China
Olympic silver medalists for China
Olympic medalists in table tennis
Medalists at the 2000 Summer Olympics
Table tennis players at the 2000 Summer Olympics
Sportspeople from Xuzhou
Table tennis players from Jiangsu
21st-century Chinese women